General Sir William Keppel GCB (died 11 December 1834) was a British soldier and colonial administrator.

Military career
He entered the army as an ensign in the 25th Regiment of Foot on 25 January 1777, and became a lieutenant in the 60th Regiment of Foot 4 March 1777. He subsequently served in the 23rd Regiment of Foot and the 15th Regiment of Foot the next year, the 82nd Regiment of Foot in 1782, and the 93rd Regiment of Foot in 1783. He was breveted colonel in 1794. On 20 May 1795, he was promoted colonel of the 3rd West India Regiment, which he commanded until 1806.

He was governor of Martinique 1796–1802. In 1803, he was promoted to lieutenant general. On 24 April 1806, he was appointed colonel of the King's Royal Rifle Corps until 7 February 1811, when he transferred as colonel to the 67th Regiment of Foot, which he commanded until 1828. He was promoted full General on 4 June 1813.

He became Governor of Portsmouth in 1826 and he was sworn of the Privy Council and appointed Governor of Guernsey in 1827. On 25 August 1828, he was appointed colonel of the 2nd (The Queen's Royal) Regiment of Foot.

He was a Groom of the Bedchamber and Equerry to King George IV of the United Kingdom from 1812 to 1830 (including the period 1812 to 1820 when the King acted as Prince Regent during his father's mental illness). He was knighted in 1813 
and on 2 January 1815, made a Knight Grand Cross of the Order of the Bath

References

Sources

1834 deaths
Members of the Privy Council of the United Kingdom
Knights Grand Cross of the Order of the Bath
British Army generals
67th Regiment of Foot officers
93rd Regiment of Foot officers
East Yorkshire Regiment officers
King's Own Scottish Borderers officers
Queen's Royal Regiment officers
Royal American Regiment officers
Royal Welch Fusiliers officers
West India Regiment officers
Year of birth missing
British Governors of Martinique